Huijian Xinmo is a wuxia novel by Liang Yusheng first published as a serial between 23 May 1966 and 14 March 1968 in the Hong Kong newspaper Ta Kung Pao. The final part of a trilogy, the novel is preceded by Datang Youxia Zhuan and Longfeng Baochai Yuan. The title of the novel comes from a Buddhist saying, huī huìjiàn, zhǎn xīnmó, which means "brandish the sword of wisdom and slay your inner demons".

Plot 
The novel is set in China during the Tang dynasty towards the end of the An Lushan Rebellion (755–763), and serves as a continuation of Longfeng Baochai Yuan, the second part of the trilogy.

Decades have passed since Wang Yanyu killed Dou Lingkan and the Wangs massacred the Dous in the first novel Datang Youxia Zhuan. Unknown to everyone, Dou Yuan, a member of the Dou family, had survived the massacre and spent the past several years training in martial arts with the aim of avenging his family. Upon revealing himself to the wulin (martial artists' community), Dou Yuan kills Wang Yanyu and her husband, Zhan Yuanxiu. Before dying, Wang Yanyu tells her son, Zhan Bocheng, to find Chu Sui, a former subordinate of her father Wang Botong. She also forbids him from seeking revenge on Dou Yuan and informing Tie Mole, the current chief of the wulin, about their deaths because Tie Mole was Dou Lingkan's godson and would find himself in a difficult position to deal with Dou Yuan.

Chu Sui favours Zhan Bocheng and wants to arrange for him to marry his granddaughter, Chu Baoling. However, Chu Baoling is already in love with Liu Mang, a young outlaw. Liu Mang and his father are planning to rob a treasure hoard left behind by Wang Botong. Chu Sui intervenes to stop Liu Mang, and both sides clash. Dou Yuan takes advantage of the conflict to seize the treasure. Chu Sui dies after sustaining serious injuries, while Zhan Bocheng is saved by Tie Mole's children. Tie Mole gains control of the treasure and uses it to support the outlaws on Golden Rooster Ridge.

Meanwhile, Dou Yuan wants to dominate the wulin so he allies himself with lowlifes, corrupt government officials, and foreign tribes. With backing from Uyghur nobles and a rebel leader Tian Chengsi, Dou Yuan tries to stir up conflict in the wulin.

Zhan Bocheng and Tie Mole's children run into trouble while escorting the treasure, but are saved by Hua Zongdai and his daughter. At the same time, the children of Nan Jiyun also join the fight against the villains. Dou Yuan makes bigger plans to gain control over the Yangtze River. Under the leadership of Kongkong'er, the young heroes battle against Dou Yuan and his allies and eventually defeat them.

Around the same time, they receive news that their ally, the Shituo Kingdom, is under attack by the Uyghurs, so they travel to the Shituo Kingdom and assist them in driving away the invaders. Dou Yuan and his Uyghur allies enlist the help of Sikong Tu and his men to fight the heroes. In the ensuing battle, the heroes defeat the villains; Dou Yuan is crippled by Zhan Bocheng and Chu Baoling, rendering him unable to his skills to commit evil again.

References 

 

Novels by Liang Yusheng
Novels set in the Tang dynasty